The Queen Is Dead is the third studio album by The Smiths.

The Queen Is Dead may also refer to:

 "The Queen Is Dead" (song), the album's title track
 "The Queen Is Dead" (Once Upon a Time), the fifteenth episode of the second season of Once Upon a Time
 The queen is dead, long live the queen!, a traditional proclamation made following the accession of a new monarch

See also
 The King Is Dead (disambiguation)